Hernán Córdoba Rentería (2 November 1989 – 20 September 2009) was a Colombian footballer who played as a striker or attacking midfielder for Atlético Huila in the Categoría Primera A.

Club career 
Córdoba began his career with Olimpia Fútbol Club de Palmira and in 2006 was scouted by Deportivo Cali, then in January 2007 he joined Córdoba on a short-loan, returning back to Cali in July 2007. After a few years with Deportivo Cali, he joined Atlético Huila in January 2009 and in summer 2009, because of his great performances, was linked with SV Werder Bremen. He played his last match for Huila in a 2–1 victory against Deportivo Pereira on 19 September 2009.

International career 
Córdoba was a member of the Colombia national football team at Under-17 and Under-20 level.

Death 
On 20 September 2009, while returning to the city of Neiva after a victory against Deportivo Pereira along with his teammate Mario Beltrán, Renteria along with his teammate were involved in a car accident with a bus, and died immediately on impact.

Personal 
Herman was the brother of footballer Giovanni Córdoba who died in 2002 after being hit by a lightning strike during a training session.

References

External links 
Ficha en BDFA
Ficha en Golgolgol

1989 births
2009 deaths
Colombian footballers
Deportivo Cali footballers
Atlético Huila footballers
Road incident deaths in Colombia
Association football forwards
People from Palmira, Valle del Cauca
Sportspeople from Valle del Cauca Department
21st-century Colombian people